Floydiella is a genus of green algae in the family Chaetopeltidaceae.

The genus name of Floydiella is in honour of Gary L. Floyd (b.1940), an American botanist and Professor of Botany at Columbus State Community College.

The genus was circumscribed by Thomas Friedl and Charles J. O'Kelly in Eur. J. Phycol. Vol.37 on page 382 in 2002.

References

External links

Chlorophyceae genera
Chaetopeltidales